Norberto Raúl Acosta (born May 22, 1976, in Buenos Aires, Argentina) is a former Argentine footballer currently coach Juventud Unida (G) of the Primera B Nacional in Argentina.

Teams
  River Plate 1998-2000
  Instituto de Córdoba 2000-2001
  River Plate 2001
  Instituto de Córdoba 2002
  Santiago Wanderers 2002
  Defensores de Belgrano 2003-2004
  Platense 2004-2006
  Juventud Unida (G) 2006-2011

References
 

1976 births
Living people
Argentine expatriate footballers
Argentine footballers
Defensores de Belgrano footballers
Club Atlético Platense footballers
Club Atlético River Plate footballers
Instituto footballers
Santiago Wanderers footballers
Chilean Primera División players
Argentine Primera División players
Expatriate footballers in Chile
Association football defenders
Footballers from Buenos Aires